Mikkelsen is a Danish-Norwegian patronymic surname meaning "son of Mikkel" (equivalent of Michael). People with the name Mikkelsen include:

People
Andreas Mikkelsen - Norwegian rally driver
Bård Mikkelsen - Norwegian businessperson
Brian Mikkelsen - Danish politician
Caroline Mikkelsen - Norwegian Antarctica Explorer
Dag Martin Mikkelsen - Norwegian poker player
Ejnar Mikkelsen (1880–1971) - Danish polar explorer
Hans Mikkelsen – Translator of the Bible
Helmer Mikkelsen - Norwegian politician for the Labour Party
Henriette Mikkelsen - Danish handball player
Jákup Mikkelsen - Faroese football goalkeeper 
Jens Kramer Mikkelsen - Lord Mayor of Copenhagen for the Social Democratic Party 
Jeppe Mikkelsen - Danish MP
Jesper Mikkelsen - Danish professional football defender
Karin Mikkelsen, Danish cricketer
Knut Ragnar Mikkelsen - Norwegian police chief
Kurtis Dam-Mikkelsen, Swiss-American drag queen known as Miss Fame
Lars Mikkelsen - Danish actor
Mads Mikkelsen - Danish actor
Marcus Mikkelsen - American entrepreneur
Martin Mikkelsen - Danish professional football midfielder
Mikkel Mikkelsen - Governor-General of the Danish West Indies
Pete Mikkelsen (1939–2006) - American baseball player
Peter Mikkelsen (badminton) - Danish badminton player 
Peter Mikkelsen (referee) - retired Danish football (soccer) referee 
Ragnhild Mikkelsen - Norwegian female speed skater 
Tobias Mikkelsen - Danish professional football player
Tórður Mikkelsen - Faroese radio and TV presenter
Vern Mikkelsen (1928–2013) - American basketball player

Other
Mikkelsen Bay - bay along the west coast of Graham Land, Antarctica
Mikkelsen Islands - small group of islands off the southeast coast of Adelaide Island
HDMS Ejnar Mikkelsen (P571) - Royal Danish Navy patrol vessel

See also
 Michaelson
 Michelson
 Mickelson
 Michaelsen
 Michelsen
 Mikkelson

Danish-language surnames
Norwegian-language surnames
Patronymic surnames
Surnames from given names